Cheshmeh Talkhu (also Romanized as Cheshmeh Talkhū and Cheshmeh-ye Talkhū) is a village in Hamaijan Rural District, Hamaijan District, Sepidan County, Fars Province, Iran. At the 2006 census, its population was 334, in 76 families.

References 

Populated places in Sepidan County